Paolo Conti (born 1 April 1950) is a former Italian football goalkeeper.

Club career
Throughout his club career, Conti played for 9 seasons (193 games) in the Italian Serie A for A.S. Roma (1973–80), U.C. Sampdoria (1981–83), and ACF Fiorentina (1984–88), winning a Coppa Italia with Roma in 1980.

International career
At international level, Conti played for the Italy national football team, and was a member of the 1978 FIFA World Cup squad which finished in fourth place, under manager Enzo Bearzot, serving as a back-up to Dino Zoff; in total he made seven appearances for Italy between 1977 and 1979.

Style of play
Regarded as one of the greatest and most experienced Italian goalkeepers of his generation, Conti was known for his composure, shot-stopping ability and consistency, as well as his ability to rush off his line or come out and claim crosses.

Honours

Club
Roma
Coppa Italia: 1979–80

Bari
Serie C1: 1983–84

References

External links
 Career summary by playerhistory.com 
 

1950 births
Living people
Sportspeople from the Province of Rimini
Italian footballers
Italy under-21 international footballers
Italy international footballers
1978 FIFA World Cup players
Association football goalkeepers
Serie A players
Serie B players
Serie C players
A.S.D. Riccione 1929 players
Modena F.C. players
S.S. Arezzo players
A.S. Roma players
Hellas Verona F.C. players
U.C. Sampdoria players
S.S.C. Bari players
ACF Fiorentina players
Footballers from Emilia-Romagna